Acacia anserina, also known as hairy sandstone wattle, is a shrub of the genus Acacia and the subgenus Plurinerves. It is native to a small area in the Kimberley region of Western Australia.

Description
Like most species of Acacia it has phyllodes rather than true leaves. The evergreen dimidiate phyllodes have a widely elliptic or occasionally widely obovate shape with a rounded upper margin and a more or less straight lower margin. When it blooms it produces simple inflorescences with spherical flower-heads containing 17 to 25 light golden coloured flowers.

Taxonomy
The species was first formally described by the botanists Bruce Maslin, Matthew David Barrett and Russell Lindsay Barrett in 2013 as part of the work A baker's dozen of new wattles highlights significant Acacia (Fabaceae: Mimosoideae) diversity and endemism in the north-west Kimberley region of Western Australia as published in the journal Nuytsia.

Distribution
It is confined to a small area in the Princess May Range on gentle slopes under sandstone ridges among a fire-protected pocket of dense vegetation in the west Kimberley.

See also
List of Acacia species

References

anserina
Acacias of Western Australia
Plants described in 2013
Taxa named by Russell Lindsay Barrett
Taxa named by Bruce Maslin
Taxa named by Matthew David Barrett